NGC 643 is an open cluster located on the far outskirts of the Small Magellanic Cloud in the southern constellation of Hydrus, approximately 200,000 light-years from Earth. Due to their close proximity to NGC 643, the open cluster ESO 29-SC44 and the galaxies PGC 6117 and PGC 6256 are also designated NGC 643A, NGC 643B and NGC 643C, respectively. NGC 643 is relatively old. Its brightest stars have an apparent magnitude of 19.

Observation history 
NGC 643 was discovered by the British astronomer John Herschel on 18 September, 1835. John Louis Emil Dreyer, compiler of the first New General Catalogue of Nebulae and Clusters of Stars, described NGC 643 as being "very faint, pretty small, round" and as becoming "very gradually a little brighter [in the] middle".

See also 
 List of open clusters

References 

Discoveries by John Herschel
Astronomical objects discovered in 1835
Open clusters
Hydrus (constellation)
643